Aleec Harris (born October 31, 1990) is an American track and field hurdler.

Amateur career
From Atlanta, Georgia, Harris was a Georgia state champion in high school.

Harris competed for the USC Trojans and at Barton Community College.  At Barton Community College he was a NJCAA champion in the 110 meter hurdles.

At the 2014 NCAA Division I Indoor Track and Field Championships he finished 5th in the 60 meter hurdles.

At the 2014 NCAA Division I Outdoor Track and Field Championships he was runner-up in the 110 meter hurdles in a photo finish.

National and international career
At the 2014 USA Outdoor Track and Field Championships Harris finished fourth in the 110 meter hurdles.

Harris won a senior national championship in the 60 meter hurdles at the 2015 USA Indoor Track and Field Championships.

At the 2015 USA Outdoor Track and Field Championships Harris finished fourth in the 110 meter hurdles, beating Jeff Porter by .005 seconds.  While normally the top three runners qualify for the world championships, the event winner (David Oliver) earned a bye to the world championships by virtue of being the defending world champion.  Therefore, Harris earned the final spot in his event to the 2015 World Championships in Athletics.

References

External links
 
 
 

1990 births
Living people
Track and field athletes from Atlanta
American male hurdlers
African-American male track and field athletes
USC Trojans men's track and field athletes
World Athletics Championships athletes for the United States
Barton Cougars men's track and field athletes
USA Outdoor Track and Field Championships winners
USA Indoor Track and Field Championships winners
21st-century African-American sportspeople